Sa Dragonera is an uninhabited islet in the Balearic Islands, Spain, located just off the west coast of Majorca. It is currently a natural park.

Geography
Geologically speaking, Dragonera is an emerged part of the geologic system running southwest-northeast in the Iberian Peninsula. This runs from the Málaga province through Cap de la Nau and then gets submerged under the Mediterranean Sea. It surfaces again to form the island of Ibiza, the Tramuntana Range in the island of Majorca and Sa Dragonera itself. The silhouette of the mountain range vaguely resembles a dragon, hence its name.

Sa Dragonera is approximately 3,200 metres in length and has a maximum width of 500 metres. Although its highest hill Pico Popi is only 360 metres high, the island's overall relief is very abrupt, especially considering its small size, which made the islet of little importance in historic times.

The island is a part of the municipality of Andratx, which is, along with Sant Elm (both in nearby Majorca), the closest towns to the island.

Dragonera has a small natural port in the Cala Lladó area.

History

The name of Dragonera comes from Dragon that was associated to the shape that the island has from a specific perspective, and from the large number of endemic Lilford's wall lizards.

There is an Ancient Roman necropolis in the Es Lladó area, but there are no other signs of historical permanent settling.

During the 18th century two defensive watchtowers were built on the island in order to watch for the numerous Barbary pirates operating in the area.

In 1910 the lighthouses of Tramuntana (north) and Llebeig (southwest) began to operate, replacing the Faro Viejo or old lighthouse, which was built in a lower part of the island, in an area often surrounded by mist.

In 1941 Juan Flexas bought the islet and started farming activities in the Es Lladó area.

By the mid 20th century, the islet was often used by estraperlo smugglers for their illegal activities.

Between 1960 and 1975 the lighthouses were improved and became automatic, which meant that the only permanent and tiny population (that of the lighthouse keeper and family) left the islet.

In 1974 the islet was bought by a Spanish company in order to build a touristic resort. The original plan included a luxury residential, an hotel, a casino and, to serve all these, a manmade port. These plans were heavily contested by the ecologist movements and a harsh and long legal battle followed. The ecologists managed to get all the plans on hold until the legal controversy was cleared. It only finished ten years after, in 1984, when the Audiencia Nacional finally barred any building activities on the uninhabited islet.

Part of the 1982 film adapting Agatha Christie's mystery Evil Under the Sun was shot in Sa Dragonera, presented as an island of the fictional Tyrania by the Adriatic.

Then, in 1987, the Consell Insular de Mallorca bought the islet. In 1995 the Balearic regional Government declared the islet natural park status along with the nearby islets of Pantaleu and Isla Mediana.

Gallery

References

External links

 Sa Dragonera - S'Arracó
 Dragonera in Google Maps

Landforms of Mallorca
Natural parks of Spain
Protected areas of the Balearic Islands
Islands of the Balearic Islands
Uninhabited islands of Spain